Kampong Lugu is a village in the west of Brunei-Muara District. It comprises the original village settlement and the public housing estate RPN Kampong Lugu. The population was 2,082 in 2016. It is one of the villages within Mukim Sengkurong.

Geography 
Kampong Lugu is located in the westernmost part of Brunei-Muara District and thus borders Tutong District. It neighbours Kampong Katimahar to the south. Lugu Lake is an artificial freshwater lagoon which sits below the RPN Kampong Lugu and along the Muara–Tutong Highway.

See also 
 List of public housing estates in Brunei

References 

Villages in Brunei-Muara District
Public housing estates in Brunei